George Datoru (born 25 May 1977 in Port Harcourt) is a former Nigerian football striker.

Career 
Having spent many years playing in Austria, he holds an Austrian passport as well. After a season with Sharks, Datoru signed with an Austrian club. In July 2004 he joined to Xanthi FC.

Honours
Cypriot Cup:
Runner-up (1): 2006

References

External links
George Datoru NigerianPlayers.com

1977 births
Living people
Nigerian footballers
Nigerian expatriate footballers
Nigeria international footballers
Footballers from Rivers State
Israeli Premier League players
Liga Leumit players
Super League Greece players
Austrian Football Bundesliga players
Cypriot First Division players
AEK Larnaca FC players
FK Austria Wien players
Association football forwards
Hapoel Be'er Sheva F.C. players
Hapoel Ramat Gan F.C. players
Maccabi Ironi Bat Yam F.C. players
Expatriate footballers in Israel
Nigerian expatriate sportspeople in Greece
Expatriate footballers in Cyprus
Sharks F.C. players
Nigerian expatriate sportspeople in Austria
Xanthi F.C. players
Expatriate footballers in Greece
Sportspeople from Port Harcourt